SNDT Women's University, also called by its full name Shreemati Nathibai Damodar Thackersey Women's University, is a women's university in the city of Mumbai, India. The university headquarters are at Churchgate in South Mumbai, while the main campus is at Churchgate there are two other campuses one in Santacruz–Juhu area of Mumbai and another at Pune. The university has affiliated colleges in Maharashtra, Assam, Uttar Pradesh, Bihar, Madhya Pradesh, Surat and Goa, as well. Dhondo keshav Karve played key role in its establishment. Karve was inspired by novel on  japan women's university in 1915.

History
In 1920 the university was named Shreemati Nathibai Damodar Thackersey Women's University. Mr.Vitthaldas Thakarsey pledged ₹1500000 at that time in the memories of his beloved mother Shreemati Nathibai Damodar Thakarsey, and so the name SNDT was given to the university. The money was never completely paid. Today, the university has an enrolment of over 70,000 students. It has three campuses at Churchgate, Santacruz-Juhu, Pune.

Notable alumni

 Anita Dongre, designer
 Masaba Gupta, designer
 Neeta Lulla, designer
 Jaya Mehta, Gujarati poet and critic
 Chitra Mudgal, noted Hindi writer
 Rani Mukherjee, Indian actress
 Heera Pathak, Gujarati poet and critic
 Shruti Sadolikar, Indian classical music singer
 Sonakshi Sinha, Indian actress
 Bharati Vaishampayan, Indian classical music singer
 Vasubahen, Gujarati writer

References

 
Universities in Mumbai
Educational institutions established in 1916
Women's universities and colleges in Maharashtra
1916 establishments in India